Pat's Great Hits is the first greatest-hits album by Pat Boone. It was released in 1957 on Dot Records.

Track listing

Certifications

References 

1957 compilation albums
Pat Boone albums
Dot Records compilation albums